Joseph Henry Shea (January 22, 1847 – December 12, 1937) was an American soldier who fought for the Union Army during the American Civil War. He received the Medal of Honor for valor.

Biography
Shea joined the 92nd New York Volunteer Infantry in January 1863. He received the Medal of Honor in March 1866 for his actions at the Battle of Chaffin's Farm on September 29, 1864. He was transferred to the 96th New York Volunteer Infantry in December 1864, and was mustered out in January 1866.

Medal of Honor citation

Citation:

Gallantry in bringing wounded from the field under heavy fire."

See also

List of American Civil War Medal of Honor recipients: Q-S

References

External links

Military Times

1847 births
1937 deaths
Union Army soldiers
United States Army Medal of Honor recipients
American Civil War recipients of the Medal of Honor
People from Baltimore
Military personnel from New York (state)
Military personnel from Maryland